Birtouta is a town and commune in Algiers Province, Algeria. , the commune had a total population of 30,575.

Notable people

See also

Communes of Algeria

References

Communes of Algiers Province